Ashraf Ali may refer to:

 Ashraf Ali (cricketer, born 1958), Pakistani Test cricketer
 Ashraf Ali (cricketer, born 1979), Pakistani cricketer
 Ashraf Ali (Karachi cricketer) (born 1982), Pakistani cricketer